Sherwan is a Tehsil from the Abbottabad District in the Khyber-Pakhtunkhwa province of Pakistan, located 35 km west of Abbottabad. Sherwan consists of two adjacent villages. The northern part is referred to as Sherwan Kalan, and the southern as Sherwan Khurd. Sherwan is on a ridge 5,000 feet high in the centre of Lower Tanawal.

Sherwan is located in a valley which is surrounded by large, forested mountains on three sides. These forests host various wild animals, such as jackals, wolves, pigs, porcupines, foxes, and occasionally leopards. Sherwan is divided into two parts: Sherwan Khurd (small) and Sherwan Kalan (wide). Sherwan Kalan covers a much larger area than Sherwan Khurd. A village called Patheel is on the northeast of Sherwan Union Council. To the west of Sherwan Union Council is another village called Bacha Kalan. A stream called Mangal lies south of the valley; it is home to several fish such as trout, eels, soles, and others.

Location and demographics
Sherwan is 5,000 ft high in the centre of Tanawal. The population of the main Sherwan village, or villages complex, is over 25,000. The local language is Hindko; the local people also understand and speak Urdu. The Tanawal was divided into two parts, Upper Tanawal and Lower Tanawal. Sherwan is located in Lower Tanawal. The main tribe of Sherwan is the Tanoli; other tribes include the Gujjars, the Awans, the Syeds, and the Mughals.

Subdivisions
Bammochi
Patheel
Kalar Khaitar
Kuhmar
Shaheed Abad
Sherwan Kalan
Sherwan Khurd
Thorey
Khanda Kahou

Education and literacy
The literacy rate of Sherwan is high compared to other villages in the area. In 2019, the best teacher of Pakistan award winner, Ejaz Ahmed Tanoli, was from Sherwan (Patheel). His son Osama Muneem Khan (founder of Umeed e Sahar) is also from Sherwan and is known for helping orphans to receive a quality education. There are many government schools and colleges in Sherwan:

Sherwan Government College for Boys
Sherwan Government College for Girls
Sherwan Government High School (Boys)
Sherwan Government High School (Girls)
Sherwan Government Primary School (Boys)
Sherwan Government Primary School (Girls)

Sherwan also has a police station.

History

Under Turkish rule

Tanawal was a part of Pakhli, which was ruled by Turks for centuries. Sherwan was the capital of Lower Tanawal under the Turks. The last Turkish Wali (governor) of the area was Qias-ud-din during the third quarter of 18th century.

Under the rule of the Sikhs
After doing away with Sardar Muhammad Khan Tarin, Bostan Khan Tarin, and others in lower Hazara, the Sikhs tormented and persecuted the population. The Mashwanis of Srikot were forced to migrate from their homelands, and because of this, they were refugees in nearby localities for six to seven years. Many of them crossed the Indus and moved to Swabi. The Sikhs also forcefully conscripted several Mashwani youths in their army. After the death of Maharaja Ranjit Singh, the Sikh empire fell prey to disorder and their rule weakened.

In 1849, the Sikhs were finally defeated by the British and the area came under the British jurisdiction in the Hazara district.

Under British rule
The British ruled the region mostly through the local chiefs. Nawab Khan Tanaoli and his allies conquered Sherwan Fort, Sherwan and nearby villages and continued ruling Sherwan.

Fort of Sherwan

Sherwan Fort was built by the Sikhs in 1822 A.D. It was stormed and conquered by Nawab Khan Tanoli. Later, Major James Abbott constructed the interior in a Victorian style. It was auctioned on May 24, 2007. The fort was mentioned by Sir General James Abbott, one of the builders of the British Empire, in his diaries.

Economy
Locals grow seasonal grain crops such as maize and wheat. The area of Sherwan has plenty of water and soil rich with nutrients, allowing producers to grow cherries, plums, apples, pears, and apricots. The mountains of Sherwan are full of minerals like soapstone. The largest soapstone deposits of the country are located near Sherwan in Hazara. A huge deposit of soapstone is found in the mountains of a nearby village. A large number of people are also engaged in soapstone mining. The most extensive steatite deposits in Pakistan are found in the Sherwan area of the Hazara District. Iron ore, lead, and magnesite ore are also found in these mountains.

External links
 Sherwan on Google Maps

See also
 Tanoli
 Amb State

References

Union councils of Abbottabad District